Barkway is a  long-established  village and civil parish in the North Hertfordshire district of Hertfordshire, England, about five miles south-east of Royston, 35 miles from London and 15 miles from the centre of Cambridge. The Prime Meridian passes a mile or so to the west of Barkway.

History
Reputedly listed in the Domesday Book of 1086 as Birchwig, meaning Birch Way.  Barkway has a number of 15th and 16th century properties, some with beautifully thatched roofs. Most properties are on or near the High Street, which is part of the old London to Cambridge coaching route. Barkway has had a village church for over 1000 years. The current flint and stone church, which is over 800 years old, has a full peal of 8 bells which are rung every week. The village has an infants' school, the Tally Ho pub, a recreation ground with children's play area and football pitch, a Golf Course, a Garage and a number of active social organisations.  According to the 2001 census Barkway had a population of 656. Two major estates are adjacent to the north of the village: Cokenach, which has a long-established cricket club, and Newsells which is now a stud farm.

Governance
Barkway has three tiers of local government at parish, district and county level: Barkway Parish Council, North Hertfordshire District Council, and Hertfordshire County Council.

Barkway is an ancient parish, and it was part of the hundred of Edwinstree. Barkway was included in the Royston Poor Law Union from 1835. The Local Government Act 1894 created parish and district councils. The parish of Barkway was included in Ashwell Rural District from 28 December 1894, and Barkway Parish Council came into being on 31 December 1894, taking over the secular functions of the parish vestry. Despite the name, Ashwell Rural District Council was based in the town of Royston. Ashwell Rural District was abolished in 1935, becoming part of Hitchin Rural District, which in turn was abolished in 1974, becoming part of North Hertfordshire.

Notable residents
Sir Humphrey de Trafford, a prominent racehorse owner, resided at the Newsells Park Estate with his family from 1926 until his death in 1971.
Richard J. Evans, Regius Professor Emeritus of History at Cambridge.

See also
 RAF Barkway
 Nuthampstead, location of the Barkway VOR
 The Hundred Parishes

References

External links

Barkway-Newsells village site
Cokenach Cricket Club
 

 
Villages in Hertfordshire
Civil parishes in Hertfordshire
North Hertfordshire District